Parijat Kusum Chakma (1946 – 28 March 1998) was a Bangladeshi  academic and politician from Rangamati belonging to Bangladesh Nationalist Party. He was a member of the Jatiya Sangsad.

Biography
Parijat Kusum Chakma was born on 1946 in Rangamati. He graduated in 1969. He was a teacher of Shah High School and Rupkari High School. He was the headmaster of Kachalong High School too.

Chakma was elected as a member of Rangamati Hill District Council in 1989. He was elected as a chairman of Rangamati Hill District Council in 1992. He was elected as a member of the Jatiya Sangsad from Rangamati in the Sixth General Election of Bangladesh.

Chakma died on 28 March 1998 at the age of 51.

References

1946 births
1998 deaths
People from Rangamati District
Bangladeshi educators
6th Jatiya Sangsad members
Bangladesh Nationalist Party politicians